Pony is the debut studio album by South African country musician Orville Peck, released on March 22, 2019 by Sub Pop. A country, alternative country, and cowboy pop album, Pony features elements of goth, dream pop, shoegazing, indie rock, surf rock, post-punk, gospel folk.

Pony was named to the initial longlist for the 2019 Polaris Music Prize in June 2019. The album also received a Juno Award nomination for Alternative Album of the Year at the Juno Awards of 2020.

Promotion
The album was promoted by the singles "Dead of Night", "Big Sky", "Turn to Hate", "Hope to Die", "Nothing Fades Like the Light", and "Queen of the Rodeo".
"Dead of Night" and "Take You Back" were performed live on CBC Radio One's Q in June 2019. "Dead of Night" was performed on Jimmy Kimmel Live on January 29, 2020. A tour of selected cities in the United States was also announced for Spring 2020, including performances at the Coachella and Stagecoach festivals. however, due to the COVID-19 pandemic, the tour was postponed.

Themes and influences 
Pony mainly focuses on themes of love and heartbreak through lyrical storytelling, with many characters based on people from the artist's own life. Peck describes the inspiration behind the album as his "love letter to a classic country album … a collection of stories." Tracks from the album such as "Big Sky" and "Dead of Night" portray different characters falling in and out of love and the escapades of their lives, whereas "Roses Are Falling" describes a fictional love interest that the narrator loves so much, they want to kill them. "Turn To Hate" discusses personal heartbreak and "the anxiety that comes with being on the outside of things," while trying to keep one's sorrow from developing into hatred. Peck's self-described 'visual approach' to music combines his adoration for classic cowboy imagery such as Nudie suits with modern fashion elements, especially the musician's famous fringe mask that conceals his identity.

Critical reception

Pony received generally positive reviews from critics. Many critics praised Peck's reverence for traditional country styles, as well as the album's exploration of queer themes. "Tracks like 'Roses Are Falling' and 'Take You Back (The Iron Hoof Cattle Call)' are solid entries to the classic country canon of Glen Campbell and Loretta Lynn, while his impressive vocal range helps keep the album varied." said Matt Bobkin of Exclaim!.

Year-end lists

Track listing

Personnel
 Orville Peck – vocals, guitar, banjo, keyboards
 Duncan Hay Jennings – guitar, keyboards
 Lucas Savatti – bass
 Kris Bowering – drums
 Tina Jones – banjo
 Jordan Koop – additional guitar; recording, mixing
 Terry Ondang – backup vocals on "Dead of Night"
 Evan Desjardins – additional vocal recordings
 Sean Pearson – additional recordings
 Harris Newman – mastering
 Gordon Nicholas – cover photo
 Matt McCormick – insert illustration

Charts

References

2019 debut albums
Orville Peck albums
Sub Pop albums
Country albums by Canadian artists